Arthur Lawrence Kornfeld (born 1942) is an American musician, record producer, and music executive. He is best known as the music promoter for the Woodstock Festival held in 1969. Kornfeld is also known for his collaborations with Artie Kaplan.

Biography
Kornfeld was born in 1942 into a Jewish lower-middle-class family in Brooklyn, New York, United States.

In his early teens, when his family had moved to North Carolina, he got a job at the Charlotte Coliseum selling soda pop so he could catch acts such as Elvis Presley, Chuck Berry, and Fats Domino.

He later attended Adelphi College and American University where he would further his music career.

By 1966, Kornfeld had written over 75 Billboard charted songs and participated in over 150 albums. In 1969, Kornfeld left Capitol Records to co-create The Woodstock Music & Arts Festival, with Michael Lang .

He hosts a show, The Spirit Show with Artie Kornfeld on artistfirst.com

Personal life 
Kornfeld moved to Broward County in 1999. In 2009 he moved to Delray Beach, Florida. He lives with Caroline Ornstein.

Discography

Singles 
 The Changin' Times - "Pied Piper" / "Thank You Babe" - Philips 40320 (1965)
 The Changin' Times - "How Is The Air Up There" - Philips 40341 (1965)
 The Changin' Times - "All In The Mind Of A Young Girl" / "Aladdin" - Philips 40401 (1966)
 The Changin' Times - "I Should Have Brought Her Home" / "Goin' Lovin' With You" - Philips 40368 (1966)
 The Changin' Times - "Free Spirit (She Comes On)" / "You Just Seem To Know" - Bell 675 (1967)
 The Artie Kornfeld Circus - "The Rain, The Park And Other Things" / "The Lonely Mermaid" - Bell 697 (1967)
 The Artie Kornfeld Tree - "Country Morning On 56th Street" / "Rock 'n Roll Babies" - Dunhill D-4259 (1970)
 Artie Kornfeld - "Island Song" / "Feel" - Neighborhood NRA-4206 (1972)

Albums 
 The Artie Kornfeld Tree – A Time To Remember! – ABC/Dunhill Records – DS 50092 (1970)

Publication 
 The Pied Piper of Woodstock (Paperback), 196 pages; Publisher: Spirit of the Woodstock Nation, LLC (October 19, 2009);

References

External links 
 
 Artie Kornfeld Interview NAMM Oral History Library (2017)

1942 births
Living people
Musicians from Brooklyn
People from Levittown, New York
Songwriters from New York (state)
American male singers
Jewish American musicians
Jewish American songwriters
Record producers from New York (state)
Jewish rock musicians
Jewish folk singers
21st-century American Jews
American male songwriters
Adelphi University alumni
American University alumni